Parliamentary elections were held in Colombia on 9 March 2014 to elect members to both chambers of Congress. The nationwide constituency for the 102-member Senate was contested, as well as the 166 seats of the House of Representatives, plus the delegates to the Andean Parliament. There were 773 candidates for the Senate, 1,528 candidates for the House of Representatives, and 23 candidates for the five Colombian seats in the Andean Parliament. 32,795,962 Colombians had been registered to vote in the elections by the cut-off date of 25 January 2014.

The elections were notable for the decision by former president Álvaro Uribe to stand for the Senate, the first ex-president in modern Colombian history to run for Congress afterwards. Uribe is constitutionally barred from standing for president again, having already served two terms.

Electoral system
Both senators and representatives are elected to four-year terms however the electoral system differs. The electoral system used for the Senate is a one national constituency to elect 100 members by proportional representation whilst the remaining 2 Senators are reserved for Indigenous Colombians, who have a separate ballot. The House of Representatives uses proportional representation with the departments serving as constituencies, each electing from between 2 and 18 members.

Opinion polls

Results

Senate

Chamber of Representatives

See also
National Electoral Council

References

Parliamentary elections in Colombia
Colombia
2014 in Colombia